Latin American Federation of Neurosurgical Societies (FLANC) is the continental, non-governmental, learned society representing the neurosurgeons of Latin American region. It is one of the 5 Continental Associations (AANS, AASNS, CAANS, EANS and FLANC) of the World Federation of Neurosurgical Societies (WFNS).

References

External links
 

Learned societies of South America
Medical and health organizations based in Uruguay
Neurosurgery organizations